Sailor Moon Crystal, known in Japan as , is a 2014 original net animation adaptation of the shōjo manga series Sailor Moon written and illustrated by Naoko Takeuchi, produced in commemoration of the original series' 20th anniversary. Produced by Toei Animation and directed by Munehisa Sakai (Seasons 1 and 2) and Chiaki Kon (Season 3), the series was streamed worldwide on Niconico from July 5, 2014, to July 18, 2015. Season 1 and 2's episodes were released twice a month. Instead of remaking the 1990s anime series preceding it, Toei Animation produced Crystal as a reboot of Sailor Moon and as a more faithful adaptation of the original manga by omitting much of the original material from the first series. The story focuses on Usagi Tsukino, who is a young girl that obtains the power to become the titular character. Other Sailor Guardians join her in the search for Princess Serenity and the Silver Crystal.

The first episode had an advanced screening on June 30, 2014. In May 2014, Viz Media licensed Crystal for an English-language release in North America, simulcasting the series on Neon Alley and Hulu to coincide with the worldwide streaming. Crunchyroll also simulcast the series in a separate contract with Toei Animation. Viz premiered the first episode as part of their "Sailor Moon Day" celebration at the Anime Expo Convention in Los Angeles.

A third season, based on the Infinity arc of the manga, premiered on April 4, 2016, and concluded on June 27, 2016.

A sequel two-part film, Pretty Guardian Sailor Moon Eternal The Movie, based on the Dream arc of the manga, was released in 2021, with the first film released on January 8 and the second on February 11, followed by another sequel two-part film, Pretty Guardian Sailor Moon Cosmos The Movie, based on Stars arc of the manga, which will be released on June 9 and 30, 2023.

Plot

Dark Kingdom
Usagi Tsukino, a fourteen-year-old middle school student, meets Luna, a talking black cat that tells her that she is Sailor Moon, a Sailor Guardian destined to fight a group of villains called the Dark Kingdom. Luna also instructs Sailor Moon to find her four fellow Sailor Guardians, the long-lost Princess of an ancestral kingdom on the Moon, and a legendary artifact of supreme power known as the Silver Crystal. On her journey, Sailor Moon meets her fellow Guardians Sailor Mercury (Ami Mizuno), Sailor Mars (Rei Hino), Sailor Jupiter (Makoto Kino), Sailor Venus (Minako Aino), and a mysterious masked man called Tuxedo Mask (Mamoru Chiba), to whom Usagi is attracted. Later, Usagi and the Sailor Guardians discover that in their previous lives they were members of an ancient Moon Kingdom in a period of time called the Silver Millennium. The Dark Kingdom waged war against them, resulting in the destruction of the Moon Kingdom. It turns out that Sailor Moon herself is Princess Serenity, the Princess of the Moon Kingdom, and that she alone has the power to make the Silver Crystal appear and to use its incredible mystical powers for evil.
 
Meanwhile, Tuxedo Mask is revealed to be Prince Endymion, the first crown prince of the Earth and Serenity's lover in his previous life. After defeating the Four Kings of Heaven (who turn out to have been Prince Endymion's loyal knights in the past) and killing their leader Queen Beryl, the Sailor Guardians confront a brainwashed Endymion and the ruler of the Dark Kingdom — Queen Metaria. To prevent Queen Metaria from spreading darkness all over the Earth, the Guardians sacrifice their lives. Using the power of the Silver Crystal, Sailor Moon destroys Queen Metaria and resurrects her friends.

Black Moon
After Sailor Moon restores the Earth to normal and prepares to live a normal life again with Mamoru and her friends, a little girl falls from the sky, claiming to have the same name as Usagi, but nicknamed as "Chibiusa" by Usagi and the others. A group of villains called the Black Moon Clan, led by Prince Demande, initiate a series of operations which lead to the abductions of Sailor's Mars, Mercury, and Jupiter while looking for Chibiusa and the Silver Crystal. Chibiusa is revealed to be Sailor Moon's and Tuxedo Mask's daughter from a distant future that has been decimated by the Clan, and is searching for Sailor Moon and the Silver Crystal in order to save her mother. Sailor Moon and her friends accompany Chibiusa to the future, and they meet the Guardian of Time and Chibiusa's friend, Sailor Pluto the Sailor Guardian of Spacetime.

After being captured herself Sailor Moon then rescues Mars, Mercury, and Jupiter and together they manage to escape from the Black Moon Clan's headquarters, the planet Nemesis but Chibiusa is manipulated by Demande's advisor and the true mastermind of the Clan, Death Phantom, and transforms into Black Lady who also later brainwashes Tuxedo Mask as well. During an intense battle Demande manages to obtain the Silver Crystals of the past and the future and is about to bring them together when Sailor Pluto stops time to prevent the universe from being destroyed by this act, leading to her own death. Black Lady is shocked to see her friend die and reverts to her true self, transforming into Sailor Chibi Moon. While Demande dies protecting Sailor Moon from Death Phantom, the latter is destroyed by the combined powers of Sailor Moon and the awakened Sailor Chibi Moon. Neo Queen Serenity who had also awakened then gives Sailor Guardians new Planet Powers and gives Sailor Moon a new brooch as well (as her old one was destroyed defeating Death Phantom), Sailor Moon and her friends say goodbye to their future selves and return to the past and everything returns to normal. Chibiusa also returns to the future afterwards but returns shortly afterwards to stay in the past and train as a Sailor Guardian.

Death Busters
After students from the prestigious Mugen Academy become victims of a group of villains called the Death Busters, who transform them into Daimons, Usagi and their friends meet two Mugen Academy students: tomboyish car racer Haruka Tenoh and violinist prodigy Michiru Kaioh. Haruka and Michiru are the civilian identities of two new Sailor Guardians: Sailor Uranus and Sailor Neptune, who are initially reluctant to work with Sailor Moon and the others. Chibiusa befriends a mysterious girl named Hotaru Tomoe, daughter of Mugen Academy founder Professor Tomoe, who is later revealed to be a key figure of the Death Busters.

Sailor Pluto is reborn as university student Setsuna Meioh, and she joins Sailors Uranus and Sailor Neptune. Using the power of all nine Sailor Guardians, Usagi evolves into Super Sailor Moon. The Sailor Guardians learn that Hotaru's body is host to Mistress 9, partner of the leader of the Death Busters, Master Pharaoh 90. At the same time, Hotaru is also the lookalike reincarnation of the Sailor Guardian of Silence and Destruction, Sailor Saturn, who has the power to destroy the whole world. For this reason, Sailors Uranus, Neptune, and Pluto fear Saturn's awakening. In the climactic battle, Pharaoh 90 begins to merge himself with the planet, but the newly awakened Sailor Saturn uses her power to send him back to his dimension, the Tau Star System, sacrificing herself in the process. As Neo-Queen Serenity, Usagi restores the city and resurrects everyone that was killed in the battle, including Hotaru, who is reborn as an infant alongside Saturn's spirit within her once again. Haruka, Michiru, and Setsuna vow to be Hotaru's family and leave the city, with the promise to rejoin Usagi and her friends someday.

Production and broadcasting

Seasons 1-3

On July 6, 2012, Kodansha and Toei Animation announced that it would commence production of a new anime adaptation for a simultaneous worldwide release in 2013 as part of the series' 20th anniversary celebrations. The idol group Momoiro Clover Z would perform the opening and closing theme songs, "Moon Pride" and "Gekkō" respectively. In April 2013, it was announced the new anime had been delayed. On August 4, 2013, it was confirmed the new anime will be streamed late in the year.

On January 9, 2014, it was announced the anime would premiere in July, and on the same day, executive producer, Atsutoshi Umezawa announced that the new anime is not a remake of the previous anime, but a reboot by adapting Naoko Takeuchi's original manga from scratch. On March 13, 2014, the new anime's official website was updated to show a countdown beginning on March 14 for an announcement due to occur on March 21. That day, Toei's website showed an image displaying the key visual art, synopsis, and staff for the new anime. It also revealed the anime would be called . The series was directed by Munehisa Sakai at Toei Animation, Yūji Kobayashi handled the series' scripts, Yukie Sakō handled the character designs, and Yasuharu Takanashi composed the music.

The cast and premiere date were announced at the 20th Anniversary Project Special Stage on April 27, 2014. The anime would premiere on July 5, 2014. Episodes would premiere on the first and third Saturdays of each month. The new cast were announced, along with Kotono Mitsuishi reprising her role as Usagi Tsukino. On April 30, 2014, Toei confirmed the series would run for 26 episodes and streamed worldwide on the video sharing Niconico website with subtitles in 12 languages on the first and third Saturdays of each month. It debuted on July 5, 2014, and ended on January 17, 2015.

On November 8, 2014, it was announced that the latter half of the 26 episode-run will be the second season, covering the Black Moon arc of the manga. During a special screening of the Dark Kingdom finale on December 27, 2014, the new cast for the second season were announced. The second season debuted on February 7, 2015, and ended on July 18, 2015. The Blu-ray updated version of the first and second season aired on Japanese television in April 2015.

On September 28, 2015, the day in which the final episode of the second season was aired on Japanese television, it was announced that production for the third season of Sailor Moon Crystal was given the green light. The third season covered the Infinity arc of the manga (known as Death Busters arc in Japan). Chiaki Kon replaced Munehisa Sakai as the series director, and Akira Takahashi took over Yukie Sakō's position as a character designer. The latter returning staff and new cast for the third season were announced in a live webcast on January 27, 2016. The first episode of the third season was previewed at a special event held at Animate Ikebukuro store in Tokyo on March 6, 2016. The third season began its regular airing on Japanese television on April 4, 2016, and ended on June 27, 2016, total of 13 episodes.

Sequels

On January 25, 2017, it was announced on the Sailor Moon 25th anniversary website that Sailor Moon Crystal would receive a sequel, revealed as the fourth season covering the Dream arc of the manga, but being produced as a two-part theatrical anime film project opposed to a television season. Chiaki Kon returned as a main director, while Kazuko Tadano handled the character designs, who took over Akira Takahashi's position from the third season. Kazuyuki Fudeyasu, replacing Yūji Kobayashi, wrote the scripts, original creator & mangaka Naoko Takeuchi was credited as a chief supervisor, Yasuharu Takanashi returned to compose the music, and Studio Deen co-animated and produced the films with Toei Animation. The name for the two-part film was announced as Sailor Moon Eternal. The first film was slated to be released on September 11, 2020, but was postponed and released on January 8, 2021, due to COVID-19 pandemic. The second film was released on February 11, 2021.

The fifth and final season, based on Stars arc of the manga, was also produced as a two-part theatrical anime film project. Majority of the key staff members returned from Eternal two-part film, while Tomoya Takahashi replaced Chiaki Kon as a director. The title of the two-part film was announced as Sailor Moon Cosmos. Both films will be released on June 9 and 30, 2023, respectively.

International production and broadcast
In May 2014, Viz Media licensed the anime for an English-language release in North America as Sailor Moon Crystal. The series began streaming on Hulu and Neon Alley simultaneously on July 5, 2014. Crunchyroll also began streaming the series on its website during the simulcast. At the 2014 Anime Expo convention in Los Angeles, Viz Media announced that the cast used for the Sailor Moon re-dub would also reprise their roles in Crystal. On November 28, 2014, Madman Entertainment announced that they have the rights for Sailor Moon Crystal for Australia and New Zealand, who later broadcast the series on ABC Me, and made the series available for streaming on AnimeLab. On November 20, 2015, Viz Media started streaming the Sailor Moon Crystal English dub on Neon Alley and Hulu. In Italy, the series was broadcast on Rai Gulp, making Crystal the first series in the franchise that was broadcasting on a Rai or other channels in Italy other than Mediaset, which broadcast the original series.

In June 2021, Netflix announced that Sailor Moon Crystal will be streamed on its platform on July 1, 2021.

Related media

Home release
The first two seasons of Sailor Moon Crystal were released in Japan in thirteen Blu-ray box sets. Each volume contained two episodes. A limited edition Blu-ray was released first. A regular DVD and Blu-ray were released a month later on the exact date of the next limited edition Blu-ray. The first limited edition Blu-ray was released on October 15, 2014.

The third season of Sailor Moon Crystal was released in Japan in three Blu-ray box sets, with each volume containing four episodes each (five episodes on the last volume). The first limited edition Blu-ray was released on June 29, 2016.

Soundtrack

Yasuharu Takanashi composed the score for Sailor Moon Crystal. The series uses two pieces of theme music for the first two seasons. The character song album, titled Pretty Guardian Sailor Moon Crystal Character Song Collection: Crystal Collection, was released on April 29, 2015. For the third season, four pieces of theme music are used: one opening theme and three ending themes. The opening theme song,  has three different versions. The first version is performed by Etsuko Yakushimaru for the first four episodes and reprised for the final episode, the second version performed by Mitsuko Horie for acts 31 to 34, and the third performed by Momoiro Clover Z for acts 35 to 38. The first ending theme song is "Eternal Eternity" performed by Junko Minagawa and Sayaka Ohara, who voice Sailors Uranus and Neptune, respectively, used for acts 27 to 30 and reprised for act 39, mirroring the first version of the opening theme. The second ending theme song is  performed by Misato Fukuen, who is Chibiusa's voice actress, used for acts 31 to 34, mirroring the second version of the opening theme. The third and final ending theme song is  performed by Kenji Nojima, who is Mamoru Chiba's voice actor, used for acts 35 to 38, mirroring the third version of the opening theme.

Reception
The first episode of Sailor Moon Crystal earned a viewership of over one million on Niconico during the first two days of streaming it.

Critical response
The first two seasons of Sailor Moon Crystal were criticized for its overly fast pacing and its animation, which had noticeable errors. Victoria McNally of The Mary Sue wrote: "I can overlook poor quality animation when it's not too distracting. The problem with Sailor Moon Crystal is that it is getting distracting, because the series also has issues with the pacing and quality of its storytelling—which gives you a lot of downtime to criticize all of its visual flaws."

The third season however, was praised for its improved animation and better characterization. Michael S. Mammano of Den of Geek, who reviewed the first episode of the third season, wrote "This feels like a whole new show, and I mean that in the best way", and rated the episode 4 out of 5 stars.

Notes

References

External links
 Official site
 

2014 anime ONAs
2014 anime television series debuts
2014 Japanese television series debuts
2016 Japanese television series endings
Animated television series reboots
Anime series based on manga
Japanese children's animated superhero television series
Magical girl anime and manga
Crystal
Teen superhero television series
Television series about princesses
Television series about the Moon
Toei Animation television
Viz Media anime